In the United States, anti-miscegenation laws were passed by most states to prohibit interracial marriage, and in some cases also prohibit interracial sexual relations. Some such laws predate the establishment of the United States, some dating to the later 17th or early 18th century, a century or more after the complete racialization of slavery. Nine states never enacted such laws; 25 states had repealed their laws by 1967, when the United States Supreme Court ruled in Loving v. Virginia that such laws were unconstitutional (via the 14th Amendment adopted in 1868) in the remaining 16 states. The term miscegenation was first used in 1863, during the American Civil War, by journalists to discredit the abolitionist movement by stirring up debate over the prospect of interracial marriage after the abolition of slavery.

Typically defining mixed-race marriages or sexual relations as a felony, these laws also prohibited the issuance of marriage licenses and the solemnization of weddings between mixed-race couples and prohibited the officiation of such ceremonies. Sometimes, the individuals attempting to marry would not be held guilty of miscegenation itself, but felony charges of adultery or fornication would be brought against them instead. All anti-miscegenation laws banned marriage between whites and non-white groups, primarily black people, but often also Native Americans and Asian Americans.

In many states, anti-miscegenation laws also criminalized cohabitation and sex between whites and non-whites. In addition, Oklahoma in 1908 banned marriage "between a person of African descent" and "any person not of African descent"; Louisiana in 1920 banned marriage between Native Americans and African Americans (and from 1920 to 1942, concubinage as well); and Maryland in 1935 banned marriages between black people and Filipinos. While anti-miscegenation laws are often regarded as a Southern phenomenon, most states of the Western United States and the Great Plains also enacted them.

Although anti-miscegenation amendments were proposed in the United States Congress in 1871, 1912–1913, and 1928, a nationwide law against mixed-race marriages was never enacted. Prior to the California Supreme Court's ruling in Perez v. Sharp (1948), no court in the United States had ever struck down a ban on interracial marriage. In 1967, the United States Supreme Court (the Warren Court) unanimously ruled in Loving v. Virginia that anti-miscegenation laws are unconstitutional. After Loving, the remaining state anti-miscegenation laws were repealed; the last state to repeal its laws against interracial marriage was Alabama in 2000.

Colonial era
The first laws criminalizing marriage and sex between whites and non-whites were enacted in the colonial era in the colonies of Virginia and Maryland, which depended economically on slavery.

At first, in the 1660s, the first laws in Virginia and Maryland regulating marriage between whites and black people only pertained to the marriages of whites to black (and mulatto) enslaved people and indentured servants. In 1664, Maryland criminalized such marriages—the 1681 marriage of Irish-born Nell Butler to an enslaved African man was an early example of the application of this law. The Virginian House of Burgesses passed a law in 1691 forbidding free black people and whites to intermarry, followed by Maryland in 1692. This was the first time in American history that a law was invented that restricted access to marriage partners solely on the basis of "race", not class or condition of servitude. Later these laws also spread to colonies with fewer enslaved and free black people, such as Pennsylvania and Massachusetts. Moreover, after the independence of the United States had been established, similar laws were enacted in territories and states which outlawed slavery.

A sizable number of the indentured servants in the Thirteen Colonies were brought over from the Indian subcontinent by the East India Company. Anti-miscegenation laws discouraging interracial marriage between White Americans and non-whites affected South Asian immigrants as early as the 17th century. For example, a Eurasian daughter born to an Indian father and Irish mother in Maryland in 1680 was classified as a "mulatto" and sold into slavery. Anti-miscegenation laws there continued into the early 20th century. For example, the Bengali revolutionary Tarak Nath Das's white American wife, Mary Keatinge Morse, was stripped of her American citizenship for her marriage to an "alien ineligible for citizenship." In 1918, there was considerable controversy in Arizona when an Indian farmer B. K. Singh married the sixteen-year-old daughter of one of his white tenants.

In 1685, the French government issued a special Code Noir restricted to colonial Louisiana, which forbade marriage between Catholics and non-Catholics in that colony. However, interracial cohabitation and interracial sex were never prohibited in French Louisiana (see plaçage). The situation of the children (free or enslaved) followed the situation of the mother. Under Spanish rule, interracial marriage was possible with parental consent under the age of 25 and without it when the partners were older. In 1806, three years after the U.S. gained control over the state, interracial marriage was once again banned.

Jacqueline Battalora  argues that the first laws banning all marriage between whites and black people, enacted in Virginia and Maryland, were a response by the planter elite to the problems they were facing due to the socio-economic dynamics of the plantation system in the Southern colonies. The bans in Virginia and Maryland were established at a time when slavery was not yet fully institutionalized. At the time, most forced laborers on the plantations were indentured servants, and they were mostly European. Some historians have suggested that the at-the-time unprecedented laws banning "interracial" marriage were originally invented by planters as a divide-and-rule tactic after the uprising of European and African indentured servants in cases such as Bacon's Rebellion. According to this theory, the ban on interracial marriage was issued to split up the ethnically mixed, increasingly "mixed-race" labor force into "whites," who were given their freedom, and "blacks", who were later treated as slaves rather than as indentured servants. By outlawing "interracial" marriage, it became possible to keep these two new groups separated and prevent a new rebellion.

After independence
In 1776, seven of the Thirteen Colonies enforced laws against interracial marriage. Although slavery was gradually abolished in the North after independence, this at first had little impact on the enforcement of anti-miscegenation laws. An exception was Pennsylvania, which repealed its anti-miscegenation law in 1780, together with some of the other restrictions placed on free Black people, when it enacted a bill for the gradual abolition of slavery in the state.

The Quaker planter and slave trader Zephaniah Kingsley, Jr. publicly advocated, and personally practiced, racial mixing as a way toward ending slavery, as well as a way to produce healthier and more beautiful offspring. These views were tolerated in Spanish Florida, where free people of color had rights and could own and inherit property. After Florida became a U.S. territory in 1821, he moved with his multiple "wives", children, and the people he enslaved, to Haiti.

 
Another case of interracial marriage was Andrea Dimitry and Marianne Céleste Dragon a free woman of African and European ancestry. Such marriages gave rise to a large creole community in New Orleans. She was listed as white on her marriage certificate. Marianne's father Don Miguel Dragon and mother Marie Françoise Chauvin Beaulieu de Monpliaisir also married in New Orleans Louisiana around 1815. Marie Françoise was a woman of African ancestry. Marie Françoise Chauvin de Beaulieu de Montplaisir was originally a slave of Mr. Charles Daprémont de La Lande, a member of the Superior Council.

For the radical abolitionists who organized to oppose slavery in the 1830s, laws banning interracial marriage embodied the same racial prejudice that they saw at the root of slavery. Abolitionist leader William Lloyd Garrison took aim at Massachusetts' legal ban on interracial marriage as early as 1831. Anti-abolitionists defended the measure as necessary to prevent racial amalgamation and to maintain the Bay State's proper racial and moral order. Abolitionists, however, objected that the law, because it distinguished between "citizens on account of complexion" and violated the broad egalitarian tenets of Christianity and republicanism as well as the state constitution's promise of equality. Beginning in the late 1830s, abolitionists began a several-year petition campaign that prompted the legislature to repeal the measure in 1843. Their efforts—both tactically and intellectually—constituted a foundational moment in the era's burgeoning minority-rights politics, which would continue to expand into the 20th century. As the U.S. expanded, however, all the new slave states as well as many new free states such as Illinois and California enacted such laws.

While opposed to slavery, in a speech in Charleston, Illinois in 1858, Abraham Lincoln stated, "I am not, nor ever have been in favor of making voters or jurors of negroes, nor of qualifying them to hold office, nor to intermarry with white people".

Arkansas, Florida, Louisiana, Mississippi, Texas, South Carolina, and Alabama legalized interracial marriage for some years during the Reconstruction period. Anti-miscegenation laws rested unenforced, were overturned by courts or repealed by the state government (in Arkansas and Louisiana). However, after white Democrats took power in the South during "Redemption", anti-miscegenation laws were re-enacted and once more enforced, and in addition Jim Crow laws were enacted in the South which also enforced other forms of racial segregation. In Florida, the new Constitution of 1888 prohibited marriage between "a white person and a person of negro descent" (Article XVI, Section 24).

A number of northern and western states permanently repealed their anti-miscegenation laws during the 19th century. This, however, did little to halt anti-miscegenation sentiments in the rest of the country. Newly established western states continued to enact laws banning interracial marriage in the late 19th and early 20th centuries. Between 1913 and 1948, 30 out of the then 48 states enforced anti-miscegenation laws. Only Connecticut, New Hampshire, New York, New Jersey, Vermont, Wisconsin, Minnesota, Alaska, Hawaii, and Washington, D.C. never enacted them.

Pace v. Alabama
The constitutionality of anti-miscegenation laws was upheld by the U.S. Supreme Court in the 1883 case Pace v. Alabama (106 U.S. 583). The Supreme Court ruled that the Alabama anti-miscegenation statute did not violate the Fourteenth Amendment to the United States Constitution. According to the court, both races were treated equally, because whites and black people were punished in equal measure for breaking the law against interracial marriage and interracial sex. This judgment was overturned in 1967 in the Loving v. Virginia case, where the Supreme Court led by Chief Justice Earl Warren declared anti-miscegenation laws a violation of the Fourteenth Amendment and therefore unconstitutional.

State v. Pass (Arizona 1942) 
In State v. Pass,  the Supreme Court of Arizona rejected an appeal by Frank Pass of a murder conviction based on the testimony of his wife Ruby Contreras Pass against him, on the grounds that their marriage was illegal since Pass was partly Mexican and native American and Contreras was white. Interpreting the state's anti-miscegenation statute, the court ruled that persons of mixed racial heritage could not legally marry anyone. The court recognized that the result was absurd and expressed the hope that the legislature would amend the statute. In a deviation from anti-miscegenation laws and interpretations in other states, the court appeared to treat Hispanics/ Mexicans as separate from "Caucasian" or white, though "French" and "Spanish" ethnicities were also referred to as distinct "races".

Repeal of anti-miscegenation laws, 1948–1967
In 1948, the California Supreme Court ruled in Perez v. Sharp (1948) that the Californian anti-miscegenation laws violated the Fourteenth Amendment to the United States Constitution, the first time since Reconstruction that a state court declared such laws unconstitutional, and making California the first state since Ohio in 1887 to overturn its anti-miscegenation law.

The case raised constitutional questions in states which had similar laws, which led to the repeal or overturning of such laws in fourteen states by 1967. Sixteen states, mainly Southern states, were the exception. In any case, in the 1950s, the repeal of anti-miscegenation laws was still a controversial issue in the U.S., even among supporters of racial integration.

In a 1949 review following Perez Vs. Sharp, Edward T. Wright noted 8 states where anti-miscegenation laws specified penalties of a year or more in prison, including a provision in Virginia law of “one year in the penitentiary for any Negro registering as a white”. Wright noted that interracial marriage remained uncommon and widely disapproved of in Northern states where it was legal, in contrast to widespread fears of “amalgamation” in the South. It was further observed, “Though many states which have 'miscegenation laws have a large population of members of the race prohibited from marrying whites, there are many states which do not.” The author concluded that based on measures such as pre-marital blood tests, “(T)he worst offenders of the states failing to protect their citizens with a good health law are the very states which insist they must protect the health of their citizens by prohibiting interracial marriage.” Even in terms of  preventing mixed-race births, Wright found, “There might, in fact, be fewer mullato children if white men having illicit intercourse with Negro women knew they could no longer rest behind a law which said the woman or offspring can acquire none of the rights ordinarily afforded by the law of domestic relations… (I)f the purpose of the laws surveyed has been to prevent inter mixture of blood, it is well to conclude that they have failed to fulfill this purpose.”

In 1958, the political theorist Hannah Arendt, a Jewish refugee from Nazi Germany, who escaped from Europe during the Holocaust, wrote in an essay in response to the Little Rock Crisis, the Civil Rights struggle for the racial integration of public schools which took place in Little Rock, Arkansas, in 1957, that anti-miscegenation laws were an even deeper injustice than the racial segregation of public schools. The free choice of a spouse, she argued in Reflections on Little Rock, was "an elementary human right": "Even political rights, like the right to vote, and nearly all other rights enumerated in the Constitution, are secondary to the inalienable human rights to 'life, liberty and the pursuit of happiness' proclaimed in the Declaration of Independence; and to this category the right to home and marriage unquestionably belongs." Arendt was severely criticized by fellow liberals, who feared that her essay would arouse the racist fears common among whites and thus hinder the struggle of African Americans for civil rights and racial integration. Commenting on the Supreme Court's ruling in Brown v. Board of Education of Topeka against de jure racial segregation in education, Arendt argued that anti-miscegenation laws were more basic to racial segregation than racial segregation in education.

Arendt's analysis of the centrality of laws against interracial marriage to white supremacy echoed the conclusions of Gunnar Myrdal. In his essay Social Trends in America and Strategic Approaches to the Negro Problem (1948), Myrdal ranked the social areas where restrictions were imposed by Southern whites on the freedom of African Americans through racial segregation from the least to the most important: jobs, courts and police, politics, basic public facilities, "social equality" including dancing and handshaking, and most importantly, marriage. This ranking was indeed reflective of the way in which the barriers against desegregation fell under the pressure of the protests of the emerging civil rights movement. First, legal segregation in the army, in education and in basic public services fell, then restrictions on the voting rights of African-Americans were lifted. These victories were ensured by the Civil Rights Act of 1964. But the bans on interracial marriage were the last to go, in 1967.

Most Americans in the 1950s were opposed to interracial marriage and did not see laws banning interracial marriage as an affront to the principles of American democracy. A 1958 Gallup poll showed that 94% of Americans disapproved of interracial marriage. However, attitudes towards bans on interracial marriage quickly changed in the 1960s.

By the 1960s, civil rights organizations were helping interracial couples who were being penalized for their relationships to take their cases to the Supreme Court. Since Pace v. Alabama (1883), the Supreme Court had declined to make a judgment in such cases. But in 1964, the Warren Court decided to issue a ruling in the case of an interracial couple from Florida who had been convicted because they had been cohabiting. In McLaughlin v. Florida, the Supreme Court ruled that the Florida state law which prohibited cohabitation between whites and non-whites was unconstitutional and based solely on a policy of racial discrimination. However, the court did not rule on Florida's ban on marriage between whites and non-whites, despite the appeal of the plaintiffs to do so and the argument made by the state of Florida that its ban on cohabitation between whites and blacks was ancillary to its ban on marriage between whites and blacks. However, in 1967, the court did decide to rule on the remaining anti-miscegenation laws when it was presented with the case of Loving v. Virginia.

Loving v. Virginia

In 1967, an interracial couple, Richard and Mildred Loving, successfully challenged the constitutionality of the ban on interracial marriage in Virginia. Their case reached the US Supreme Court as Loving v. Virginia.

In 1958, the Lovings married in Washington, D.C. to evade Virginia's anti-miscegenation law (the Racial Integrity Act). On their return to Virginia, they were arrested in their bedroom for living together as an interracial couple. The judge suspended their sentence on the condition that the Lovings leave Virginia and not return for 25 years. In 1963, the Lovings, who had moved to Washington, D.C, decided to appeal this judgment. In 1965, Virginia trial court Judge Leon Bazile, who heard their original case, refused to reconsider his decision. Instead, he defended racial segregation, writing:

The Lovings then took their case to the Supreme Court of Virginia, which invalidated the original sentence but upheld the state's Racial Integrity Act. Finally, the Lovings turned to the U.S Supreme Court. The court, which had previously avoided taking miscegenation cases, agreed to hear an appeal. In 1967, 84 years after Pace v. Alabama in 1883, the Supreme Court ruled unanimously that the anti-miscegenation laws were unconstitutional. Chief Justice Warren wrote in the court majority opinion that:

The Supreme Court condemned Virginia's anti-miscegenation law as "designed to maintain White Supremacy".

Later events 
In 1967, 17 Southern states plus Oklahoma still enforced laws prohibiting marriage between whites and non-whites. Maryland repealed its law at the start of Loving v. Virginia in the Supreme Court.

After the Supreme Court ruling declaring such laws to be unconstitutional, the laws in the remaining 16 states ceased to be enforceable. Even so, it was necessary for the Supreme Court of Florida to issue a writ of mandamus in order to compel a Dade County judge to issue a marriage license to an interracial couple. Two Justices of the court dissented from the issuance of the writ. Besides removing such laws from their statute books, a number of state constitutions were also amended to remove language prohibiting miscegenation: Florida in 1969, Mississippi in 1987, South Carolina in 1998, and Alabama in 2000. In the respective referendums, 52% of voters in Mississippi, 62% of voters in South Carolina and 59% of voters in Alabama voted in favor of the amendments. In Alabama, nearly 526,000 people voted against the amendment, including a majority of voters in some rural counties.

Three months after Loving v. Virginia, "Storybook Children" sung by Billy Vera and Judy Clay became the first romantic interracial duet to chart in the U.S.

In 2009, Keith Bardwell, a justice of the peace in Robert, Louisiana, refused to officiate a civil wedding for an interracial couple. A nearby justice of the peace, on Bardwell's referral, officiated the wedding; the interracial couple sued Keith Bardwell and his wife Beth Bardwell in federal court. After facing wide criticism for his actions, including from Louisiana Governor Bobby Jindal, Bardwell resigned on November 3, 2009.

, seven states still required couples to declare their racial background when applying for a marriage license, without which they cannot marry. The states are Connecticut, Delaware, Kentucky, Louisiana, Minnesota (since 1977), New Hampshire, and Alabama. In 2019, a Virginia law that required partners to declare their race on marriage applications was challenged in court. Within a week the state's Attorney-General directed that the question is to become optional, and in October 2019, a U.S. District judge ruled the practice unconstitutional and barred Virginia from enforcing the requirement.

In 2016, Mississippi passed a law to protect "sincerely held religious beliefs or moral convictions". In September 2019, an owner of a wedding venue in Mississippi refused to allow a mixed-race wedding to take place in the venue, claiming the refusal was based on her Christian beliefs. After an outcry on social media and after consulting with her pastor, the owner apologized to the couple.

Summary

Anti-miscegenation laws repealed through 1887

Anti-miscegenation laws repealed 1948–1967

Anti-miscegenation laws overturned on June 12, 1967, by Loving v. Virginia

Proposed constitutional amendments
At least three attempts have been made to amend the US constitution to bar interracial marriage in the United States.
 In 1871, Representative Andrew King, a Democrat of Missouri, proposed a nationwide ban on interracial marriage. King proposed the amendment because he feared that the Fourteenth Amendment, ratified in 1868 to give ex-slaves citizenship (the Freedmen) as part of the process of Reconstruction, would someday render laws against interracial marriage unconstitutional, as it eventually did.
 In December 1912 and January 1913, Representative Seaborn Roddenbery, a Democrat of Georgia, introduced a proposal in the House of Representatives to insert a prohibition of miscegenation into the US Constitution. According to the wording of the proposed amendment, "Intermarriage between Negroes or persons of color and Caucasians... within the United States... is forever prohibited." Roddenbery's proposal was more severe because it defined the racial boundary between whites and "persons of color" by applying the one-drop rule. In his proposed amendment, anyone with "any trace of African or Negro blood" was banned from marrying a white spouse.

Roddenbery's proposed amendment was a direct reaction to African American heavyweight boxer Jack Johnson's marriages to white women, first to Etta Duryea and then to Lucille Cameron. In 1908, Johnson had become the first black boxing world champion, having beaten Tommy Burns. After his victory, the search was on for a white boxer, a "Great White Hope", to beat Johnson. Those hopes were dashed in 1910, when Johnson beat former world champion Jim Jeffries. This victory ignited race riots across America as frustrated whites attacked celebrating African Americans. Johnson's marriages to and affairs with white women infuriated some Americans, mostly white. In his speech introducing his bill before the United States Congress, Roddenbery compared the marriage of Johnson and Cameron to the enslavement of white women, and warned of future civil war that would ensue if interracial marriage was not made illegal nationwide:

Roddenbery's proposal of the anti-miscegenation amendment unleashed a wave of racialist support for the move: 19 states that lacked such laws proposed their enactment. In 1913, Massachusetts, which had abolished its anti-miscegenation law in 1843, enacted a measure (not repealed until 2008) that prevented couples who could not marry in their home state from marrying in Massachusetts.
 In 1928, Senator Coleman Blease, a Democrat of South Carolina, proposed an amendment that went beyond the previous ones, requiring that Congress set a punishment for interracial couples attempting to get married and for people officiating an interracial marriage. This amendment was also never enacted.

See also
 Interracial marriage in the United States
 Guess Who's Coming to Dinner

References

Further reading (most recent first)
 
 
 Pascoe, Peggy. What Comes Naturally: Miscegenation Law and the Making of Race in America. Oxford University Press, 2009.
Strandjord, Corinne. Filipino Resistance to Anti-Miscegenation Laws in Washington State Great Depression in Washington State Project, 2009.
Johnson, Stefanie. Blocking Racial Intermarriage Laws in 1935 and 1937: Seattle's First Civil Rights Coalition Seattle Civil Rights and Labor History Project, 2005.

External links
Loving v. Virginia (No. 395) Cornell Law School Legal Information Institute
Loving at Thirty by Harvard Law School Professor Randall Kennedy at SpeakOut.com
Loving Day: Celebrate the Legalization of Interracial Couples
 "The Socio-Political Context of the Integration of Sport in America", R. Reese, Cal Poly Pomona, Journal of African American Men (Volume 4, Number 3, Spring, 1999)

1660s establishments in the Thirteen Colonies
1967 disestablishments in the United States
Race and law in the United States
Race legislation in the United States
Repealed United States legislation
Politics and race in the United States
African-American segregation in the United States
Native American segregation in the United States
Interracial marriage in the United States